Forbes compiles the finances of all 28 MLS teams to produce an annual ranking of the best franchises in terms of valuation. The valuations are composed of various variables in financial information and transaction data reported by several team executives.These areas are supported by applying financial metrics such as revenue and operating income to each one.

The latest ranking reported that Los Angeles FC is the most valuable MLS franchise after the 2022 Major League Soccer season. The fastest growing MLS franchise is the Columbus Crew with a 175% increase in valuation since the 2018 Major League Soccer season ($0.2 to $0.55 billion). Los Angeles FC became the new team for highest valuation after Atlanta United FC was number one in 2019.

Several media outlets have referenced in related news or conducts analytic journalism when the ranking comes out, such as The Cincinnati Enquirer and American City Business Journals. The MLS has consistently recognized the renditions of the ranking. The report has also applied more context to MLS trends, such as the decrease in valuation in relationship with the decrease in attendance for Chicago Fire FC.

Ranking
Rankings as of February 2, 2023 (2022 Major League Soccer season)

Historical valuations

Notes

See also

 Forbes' list of the most valuable sports teams
 List of professional sports leagues by revenue

References

Major League Soccer lists
21st century-related lists
Lists of association football clubs
Association football rankings
Forbes lists